b4-4, later known as Before Four (stylized as before four), was a Canadian boy band from Toronto, Ontario. The band was composed of twins Ryan and Dan Kowarsky, along with  Ohad Einbinder. They were signed to Sony Records and achieved commercial success in Canada and later toured as Before Four in Germany.

As b4-4
The Kowarskys and Einbinder were friends for several years before the group officially formed in 1998.  After an audition for Mike Roth of Toronto's Sony Records studios, they were signed to the label. They also signed a publishing deal with Sony/ATV.

In 2000, they released their debut album b4-4.  b4-4 achieved success in Canada with the single "Get Down" and its accompanying video, and later "Go Go". Other releases included "Everyday", and "Ball and Chain". The album was certified Platinum in Canada.

In the summer of 2001, B4-4 joined Snow, Wave and soulDecision on the YTV PsykoBlast Tour and opened for Destiny's Child on MTV's Total Request Live Tour. They were also nominated for Best New Group at the 2001 Juno Awards. Also in 2001, they starred in the episode Howlin' with B4-4 in the TV series Eddy the Eco-Dog Unleashed.

As Before Four
Following their success in Canada, the trio b4-4 headed to Germany, signing with Universal Music / Polydor under the name Before Four. In 2003, they released their second album, In Your Face. That album generated three singles: "Player (You're My Ecstasy)", "I'll Be There" and "Feel Free (To Say No)".

B4-4 disbanded in 2004. Ryan and Dan Kowarsky went on to form the vocal, musical, songwriting and producing duo RyanDan. 

In 2021, "Get Down" was used as a Lip Sync for Your Life number in episode 7 of Canada's Drag Race second season, with which Gia Metric won her Lip sync competition.

Discography

Albums

Singles

Music videos

See also
RyanDan

References

External links
 Ohad Einbinder at MySpace
 RyanDan.com

Canadian boy bands
Musical groups established in 1999
Musical groups disestablished in 2004
Canadian pop music groups
Sibling musical groups
1999 establishments in Ontario